The Lesotho Amateur Radio Society (LARS) is a national non-profit organization for amateur radio enthusiasts in Lesotho.  LARS operates a QSL bureau for those members who regularly communicate with amateur radio operators in other countries, and offers radio equipment to its members for their use.  LARS represents the interests of Lesotho amateur radio operators and shortwave listeners before Lesotho and international telecommunications regulatory authorities.  LARS is the national member society representing Lesotho in the International Amateur Radio Union.

See also 
International Amateur Radio Union

References 

Lesotho
Organisations based in Lesotho
Radio in Lesotho
Organisations based in Maseru